Narthecoceratidae is an extinct family of orthocone cephalopods who lived in marine environments in what is now North America during the Ordovician from 460.5—449 mya, existing for approximately .

Taxonomy
Narthecoceratidae was named by Flower (1958). It was assigned to Endocerida by Teichert et al. (1964); and reassigned to Orthocerida by Frey (1981).

Morphology 
The shell is usually long, and may be straight ("orthoconic") or gently curved. In life, these animals may have been similar to the modern squid, except for the long shell.

Fossil distribution 
Fossil distribution includes Ohio, Franklin District, Canada, and Manitoba, Canada.

References 

Orthocerida
Prehistoric cephalopod families
Ordovician molluscs
Paleozoic cephalopods of North America
Darriwilian first appearances
Late Ordovician extinctions